Ojaküla may refer to several places in Estonia:

Ojaküla, Hiiu County, village in Hiiu Parish, Hiiu County
Ojaküla, Järva County, village in Paide Parish, Järva County
Ojaküla, Lääne-Viru County, village in Viru-Nigula Parish, Lääne-Viru County